"Desire" is a song by Swiss electronic band Yello, released in 1985. It was released as the third single from Yello's fourth studio album Stella. The song was written by Yello members Boris Blank and Dieter Meier and appears on the band's compilation album Essential Yello.

Background 
"Desire" was released on 4 June 1985. Meier's friend, Swiss TV station owner Paul Grau, had suggested that the video should be shot in Havana in Cuba to match the song's Latin sound, and the video, which included three orchestras and around 150 dancers, was filmed there in May 1985.

In popular media 
The song was later used in the Miami Vice episode "Killshot" in 1986, and in the film Dutch in 1991.

Track listing 
7" single

Track listing 
12" single

Charts

References 

Yello songs
1985 songs
1985 singles
Elektra Records singles
Vertigo Records singles
Polydor Records singles
Songs written by Boris Blank (musician)
Songs written by Dieter Meier